Lone Ranger (born Anthony Alphanso Waldron, 2 November 1958, Jubilee Hospital, Kingston, Jamaica) is a Jamaican reggae deejay who recorded nine albums between the late 1970s and mid-1980s.

Biography
Waldron spent much of his youth in the Tottenham, United Kingdom before returning to Jamaica in 1971. He began his recording career with Clement "Coxsone" Dodd's Studio One label. He initially worked as a duo with Welton Irie, but soon began recording solo, having a big hit in Jamaica with "Love Bump". He also worked on the Virgo Sound sound system. He had a number one UK reggae chart album in 1980 with Barnabas Collins. He is regarded as one of the most lyrically inventive deejays of his era, and was a major influence on British deejays of the early 1980s. He relocated to the United States in the mid-1980s, but returned to Jamaica in 1998, and began performing on sound systems once again.

Albums
 On the Other Side of Dub (1977) Studio One (reissued (1991 & 2007) Heartbeat
 Barnabas in Collins Wood (aka Barnabas Collins) (1979) GG's
 Rosemarie (1981) Black Joy (UK indie #29)
 Badda Dan Dem (1982) Studio One
 Hi-Yo, Silver, Away! (1982) Greensleeves (UK indie #19)
 M-16 (1982) Hitbound/J&L
 Dee Jay Daddy (1984) Techniques
 Learn to Drive (1985) Bebo's
 Top of the Class (2002) Studio One
 Kulchaklash (2005) T.I.M.E.C. (with Grant Phabao)
 Sweet Talking (2010) T.I.M.E.C./Colored-Inc. (with Grant Phabao)
 Dancehall Vibe EP (2017) Caribic Night Records/VPAL Music (with Carlton Livingston & Tandaro)

Compilations

 Collections (1994) Grapevine
 Rosemarie Meet DJ Daddy (2005) Techniques
 Dub Salvador (2006) T.I.M.E.C./Paris DJs

References

External links

Official website
Lone Ranger at Roots Archives
RebelBase interview

Living people
1958 births
Jamaican reggae musicians
Musicians from Kingston, Jamaica